On 20 July 1944, Adolf Hitler and his top military associates entered the briefing hut of the Wolf's Lair military headquarters, a series of concrete bunkers and shelters located deep in the forest of East Prussia, not far from the location of the World War I Battle of Tannenberg. Soon after, an explosion killed three officers and a stenographer, injuring everyone else in the room. This assassination attempt was the work of Colonel Claus von Stauffenberg, an aristocrat who had been severely wounded while serving in the North African theater of war, losing his right hand, left eye, and two fingers of his left hand.

The bomb plot was a carefully planned coup d'état attempt against the Nazi regime, orchestrated by a group of army officers. Their plan was to assassinate Hitler, seize power in Berlin, establish a new pro-Western government and save Germany from total defeat.

Immediately after the arrest and execution of the plot leaders in Berlin by Friedrich Fromm, the Gestapo (the secret police force of Nazi Germany) began arresting people involved or suspected of being involved. This opportunity was also used to eliminate other, unrelated critics of the Nazi regime. In total, an estimated 7,000 people were arrested of which approximately 4,980 were executed, some slowly strangled with piano wire on Hitler's insistence. A month after the failed attempt on Hitler's life, the Gestapo initiated Aktion Gitter.

Some of those involved include:



See also
 List of people killed or wounded in the 20 July plot

References

Sources

Printed

Online
 
 

20 July plot
20 July plot
 20 July plot
 
 
20 July plot
20 July plot, members